The 1900 Wilton by-election was a parliamentary by-election held for the British House of Commons constituency of Wilton in Wiltshire on 17 July 1900.  The seat had become vacant when  the Conservative Member of Parliament Viscount Folkestone had succeeded to the peerage as Earl of Radnor. He had held the seat since the 1892 general election.

The Conservative candidate, James Archibald Morrison, was returned unopposed.

This was the last by-election before the general election held from September to October 1900.

See also 
 Wilton (UK Parliament constituency)
 1918 Wilton by-election
 The town of Wilton
 List of United Kingdom by-elections

References 

 

1900 elections in the United Kingdom
1900 in England
19th century in Wiltshire
July 1900 events
By-elections to the Parliament of the United Kingdom in Wiltshire constituencies
Unopposed by-elections to the Parliament of the United Kingdom in English constituencies